Ernest Hartley Coleridge (1846–1920) was a British literary scholar and poet. He was son of Derwent Coleridge and grandson of Samuel Taylor Coleridge.
 
Coleridge was educated at Highgate School, Sherborne School, and Balliol College, Oxford. He did scholarly work on his grandfather's manuscripts, being the last of the Coleridges involved in their editing. He also took part in the campaign to buy the Coleridge Cottage in Nether Stowey for the nation. He provided this epitaph

Life

In 1876, he married Sarah Mary (née Bradford) of Newton Abbot, Devonshire, by whom he had two sons and two daughters.
In 1894 he was secretary to Lord Coleridge, the Lord Chief Justice, to whom he was related.
The following year he published the Letters of Samuel Taylor Coleridge, and a selection from his grandfather's unpublished notebooks entitled Anima Poetae.
He then spent several years editing and annotating the poetical works of Lord Byron, which were published by John Murray in seven volumes between 1898 and 1903. 
Over the next ten years he worked on a biography of Lord Coleridge which was published in 1904 as The Life and Correspondence of John Duke, Lord Coleridge.

Coleridge died, aged 74, in February 1920 at Aylesbury, Buckinghamshire

Works

(ed.) Anima Poetae. From the Unpublished Note-Books of Samuel Taylor Coleridge, 1895
(ed.) Letters of Samuel Taylor Coleridge, 1895
(ed. with Rowland E. Prothero) The Works of Lord Byron, 13 vols., 1898
Poems, 1898
Life & Correspondence of John Duke Lord Coleridge Lord Chief Justice of England, 2 vols., 1904
(ed.) The Complete Poetical Works of Samuel Taylor Coleridge, 1912
The Life of Thomas Coutts Banker, 2 vols., 1920

See also
Christabel Rose Coleridge, Ernest's sister

References

External links 

 
 

 

1846 births
1920 deaths
Ernest
English book editors
People educated at Sherborne School
People educated at Highgate School
Samuel Taylor Coleridge